The 1932–33 Football League season was Birmingham Football Club's 37th in the Football League and their 20th in the First Division. They finished in 13th position in the 22-team division. They also competed in the 1932–33 FA Cup, entering at the third round proper and losing to West Ham United in the sixth (quarter-final).

Twenty-four players made at least one appearance in nationally organised competition, and there were nine different goalscorers. Full-back Harold Booton and forward Tom Grosvenor were ever-present over the 47-match season, and there were joint leading scorers, with 14 goals: Ernie Curtis and, for the 12th successive season, Joe Bradford. All Bradford's goals came in the league.

At the end of the season, Birmingham were unable to match the offer made by Chelsea to Leslie Knighton to become their manager.

Football League First Division

League table (part)

FA Cup

Appearances and goals

See also
Birmingham City F.C. seasons

References
General
 
 
 Source for match dates and results: 
 Source for lineups, appearances, goalscorers and attendances: Matthews (2010), Complete Record, pp. 306–07.
 Source for kit: "Birmingham City". Historical Football Kits. Retrieved 22 May 2018.

Specific

Birmingham City F.C. seasons
Birmingham